Platinum(II) sulfide is the inorganic compound with the formula PtS. It is a green solid, insoluble in all solvents.  The compound adopts an unusual structure, being composed of square planar Pt and tetrahedral sulfide centers.  A related compound is platinum disulfide, PtS2.

References 

Sulfides
Sulfides,2